Night and Dawn (Spanish: La noche y el alba) is a 1958 Spanish drama film directed by José María Forqué and starring Francisco Rabal, Zully Moreno and Manuel Alexandre.

Plot 
Pedro is a street photographer who fought on the Republican side during the Spanish Civil War and is obsessed with a model. The young woman accidentally dies in an appointment with an engineer but Pedro is accused. Carlos, even though he knows the truth, doesn't tell the police so as not to jeopardize his career.

Cast
 Francisco Rabal as Pedro
 Zully Moreno as Marta
 Rosita Arenas as Amparo
 Antonio Vilar as Carlos
 Rafael Bardem as Director 
 María Asquerino
 Manuel Alexandre as Delegado
 Félix Dafauce as Mendoza
 Isabel de Pomés
 José Luis López Vázquez as Fotógrafo

References

Bibliography 
 Bentley, Bernard. A Companion to Spanish Cinema. Boydell & Brewer 2008.

External links 
 

1958 drama films
Spanish drama films
1958 films
1950s Spanish-language films
Films directed by José María Forqué
1950s Spanish films